The Bart Cummings is a Victoria Racing Club Group 3 Thoroughbred horse race quality handicap, over a distance of 2500 metres. It is held annually at Flemington Racecourse, Melbourne, Australia in early October.  The total prize money is A$750,000.

History

Name
The Bart Cummings is named after legendary trainer Bart Cummings (1927–2015), trainer of twelve Melbourne Cup winners. Previously known as the Banjo Paterson Handicap, the race was named after the famed trainer in 2004.

Grade
 Prior to 2007 - Handicap
 2007–2013 - Listed Race
 2014 onwards - Group 3

Distance
 2004 – 2550 metres
 2006 – 2540 metres
2007–2010 – 2520 metres
2011–2013 – 2500 metres
2014–2015 – 2520 metres
2016 onwards - 2500 metres

Winners

 2022 - Lunar Flare
 2021 - Grand Promenade
2020 - Persan
2019 - Surprise Baby
2018 - Avilius
2017 - Amelie's Star
2016 - Almandin
2015 - Let's Make Adeal
2014 - Who Shot Thebarman
2013 - Araldo
2012 - Tanby
2011 - Mourayan
2010 - Harris Tweed
2009 - Light Vision
2008 - Light Vision
2007 - Dolphin Jo
2006 - Irazu
2005 - Bugatti Royale
2004 - Yakama
2003 - Vicksburg
2002 - Freegold
2001 - Touch The Groom
2000 - Brew

See also
 List of Australian Group races
Group races

References

Horse races in Australia
Flemington Racecourse